Krugel is a surname, and may refer to:

Earl Krugel (1942–2005), an American coordinator for Jewish Defense League who pleaded guilty to terrorism charges in 2005
Armin Krugel a Swiss Nordic combined skier

See also
Kugel